Maksutlu can refer to:

 Maksutlu, Kargı
 Maksutlu Dam